Thelonious Bernard (born 9 January 1964) is a French dentist and former actor.

In 1979, Bernard starred opposite Laurence Olivier and Diane Lane in A Little Romance, a film about a romance between two young teenagers in France. Bernard was nominated for Best Leading Young Actor in a Feature Film in the first annual Young Artist Awards, but lost out to Dennis Christopher in Breaking Away.

While his co-star Lane went on to a long career, Bernard subsequently chose not to remain in show business; except for a walk-on role in Yves Boisset's Allons z'enfants in 1981, he made no more films. Instead, Bernard continued his education, and now practices as a dentist in Nantes, where he lives with his wife and children.

External links

1964 births
French male film actors
Place of birth missing (living people)
French dentists
Living people